Dena is a mountain range within the Zagros Mountains, Iran.

Dena, DeNA, or DENA may also refer to:

Businesses and organizations
 DeNA, a mobile portal and e-commerce company in Japan
 Dena Bank, a bank in India
 , the German Energy Agency; see Nuclear power in Germany
 (DENA), broadcaster of the US occupying power in post WWII Germany

People
 Dena (given name), a list of people with the name
Kanze Dena, Kenyan journalist 
Lawrence Dena, Anglican bishop in Kenya
Lal Dena, Indian historian
 Patrick de Napoli, Swiss footballer nicknamed "DeNa"
Sina Ataeian Dena, Iranian film director
Dena Cass, Miss Continental Plus 1997

Places
 Dena (land area), administrative subdivision of the area around Morella, Castellón, Spain
 Dena County, Iran

Other
 Diethylnitrosamine (DENA), a carcinogenic chemical compound found in tobacco smoke
Dena (coin), historical 10-lira coin in pre-unification Italy
 Dena, an ancient Old English name for Danes
 IKCO Dena, automobile manufactured by Iran Khodro

See also